Havila Shipping ASA was established on 31 July 2003 and operates 22 vessels; platform supply vessel, anchor handling tug supply vessel, rescue- and recovery vessel and subsea construction vessel. The company has a newbuilding program of 5  vessels. The Company's business concept is to provide maritime support functions for international offshore oil and gas production, to own and run the assets regarded as necessary or desirable for this, and to provide associated services.

The main market for the Company's ships is the North Sea and Asia Pacific region.

The Company has its head office in Fosnavåg, where it has 26 employees.

FLEET

Shipping companies of Norway
Supply shipping companies
Transport companies of Møre og Romsdal
Transport companies established in 2003
Companies listed on the Oslo Stock Exchange
Norwegian companies established in 2003